The Uruguayan ambassador in Warsaw is the official representative of the Government in Montevideo to the Government of Poland.

List of representatives

References 

Poland
Uruguay